Horistomyia is a genus of crane fly in the family Limoniidae.

Distribution
Australia.

Species
H. leucophaea (Skuse, 1890)
H. occidentalis Alexander, 1929
H. oxycantha Alexander, 1966
H. victoriae Alexander, 1929

References

Limoniidae
Nematocera genera
Diptera of Australasia